Nur Tabar (15 July 1941 – 15 August 2022) was a Tajik politician. A member of the Communist Party, he served on the Supreme Soviet of the Tajik Soviet Socialist Republic from 1987 to 1990.

Tabar died in Dushanbe on 15 August 2022, at the age of 81.

References

1941 births
2022 deaths
Soviet politicians
Tajikistani politicians
Tajikistani male writers
Tajik National University alumni
Communist Party of Tajikistan politicians
People from Districts of Republican Subordination